Mary Lou Daniel Crocker (September 17, 1944 – January 27, 2016) was an American professional golfer who played on the LPGA Tour. She also played under her maiden name, Mary Lou Daniel.

Daniel won the U.S. Girls' Junior in 1962. In 1962, she was named Kentucky Female Amateur Athlete-of-the-Year.

Crocker was the first woman to attend the University of Kentucky on a men's scholarship.

Crocker won once on the LPGA Tour in 1973.

Amateur wins (2)
1962 U.S. Girls' Junior, Western Girls' Junior

Professional wins (1)

LPGA Tour wins (1)

LPGA Tour playoff record (0–1)

References

External links

American female golfers
LPGA Tour golfers
Golfers from Kentucky
Sportspeople from Louisville, Kentucky
1944 births
2016 deaths
21st-century American women